Pupėnai is a hamlet in Kėdainiai district municipality, in Kaunas County, in central Lithuania. According to the 2011 census, the hamlet has a population of 0 people. It was depopulated during the Soviet era land development programs (the 1970 census was the last with population being detected).

Demography

References

Villages in Kaunas County
Kėdainiai District Municipality